Free Access Magazine is a free computer magazine distributed through major Australian consumer electronics retailers such Harvey Norman, Dick Smith Electronics and Myer. The magazine targets mainstream computer users and is designed to be easy to read. It covers PC and lifestyle technology.

History and profile
Free Access Magazine was started by John Pospisil and Tom Crawley in 1997 in Sydney, Australia. The first issue of the magazine was issued in July 1998. It was distributed through major retail outlets, including Harvey Norman, Dick Smith Electronics and Myer.

The magazine became an online publication in October 2006.

References

1997 establishments in Australia
2006 disestablishments in Australia
Computer magazines published in Australia
Defunct computer magazines
Defunct magazines published in Australia
Free magazines
Magazines established in 1997
Magazines disestablished in 2006
Magazines published in Sydney
Online computer magazines
Online magazines with defunct print editions